George Jones (8 January 1856 – 1 April 1936) was an English cricketer. He played 102 first-class matches for Surrey between 1875 and 1888.

See also
 List of Surrey County Cricket Club players

References

External links
 

1856 births
1936 deaths
English cricketers
Surrey cricketers
People from Mitcham
Sportspeople from Surrey
North v South cricketers
A. J. Webbe's XI cricketers